Olena Dmytrivna Kostevych (born 14 April 1985) is a Ukrainian pistol shooter. She is the 2004 Olympic champion in the 10 metre air pistol event, 2002 World champion in 10 m air pistol event and 2018 World champion in 25 m pistol event. She is also multiple European Championships champion and medalist as well as Universiade champion.

Personal life
Kostevych was born in Khabarovsk, Russian SFSR, Soviet Union. She moved to her mother's city Chernihiv and she was a student at the Chernihiv State Technological University in Chernihiv, Ukraine.

Career
Kostevych competes for Ukraine. At the age of 17, she won the 10 m air pistol event at the 2002 ISSF World Shooting Championships. She followed this with a victory in the 2003 ISSF World Cup Final, and an Olympic gold medal at the 2004 Olympics in Athens.

At the 2008 Summer Olympics, she placed 26th in the 25 metre pistol event and 31st in 10 metre air pistol. Her Ukrainian record of 394 is one point higher than the world record.

At the 2012 Summer Olympics in London, Kostevych won bronze medals in the 10 metre air pistol and 25 meter sport pistol competitions. She won no medals at the 2016 Summer Olympics in Rio de Janeiro.

At the 2020 Summer Olympics (Tokyo, 25 July 2021), she placed 4th in the 10 metre air pistol competition and on July 27, 2021 Olena Kostevych and  Oleg Omelchuk won a bronze medal in the ten-metre air pistol.

Olympic results

Records

References

External links

Olympic shooters of Ukraine
Shooters at the 2004 Summer Olympics
Shooters at the 2008 Summer Olympics
Shooters at the 2012 Summer Olympics
Shooters at the 2016 Summer Olympics
Olympic gold medalists for Ukraine
1985 births
Living people
Sportspeople from Khabarovsk
Ukrainian female sport shooters
ISSF pistol shooters
Olympic medalists in shooting
Olympic bronze medalists for Ukraine
Medalists at the 2012 Summer Olympics
Shooters at the 2015 European Games
Medalists at the 2004 Summer Olympics
Universiade medalists in shooting
Universiade gold medalists for Ukraine
Universiade silver medalists for Ukraine
Universiade bronze medalists for Ukraine
Shooters at the 2019 European Games
European Games medalists in shooting
European Games bronze medalists for Ukraine
Medalists at the 2011 Summer Universiade
Medalists at the 2013 Summer Universiade
Shooters at the 2020 Summer Olympics
Medalists at the 2020 Summer Olympics
Chernihiv Polytechnic National University alumni
20th-century Ukrainian women
21st-century Ukrainian women